A shotgun is a type of firearm.

 Sawed-off shotgun

Shotgun may also refer to:

Science and technology
Shotgun hill climbing, a type of mathematical optimization algorithm in computer science
Shotgun house, a type of narrow, rectangular house
Shotgun sequencing, a method of sequencing DNA
Shotgunning (cold reading), a "mind-reading" technique
Shotgun mic, a type of microphone with a long barrel
Shotgun debugging or shotgunning, a technique in system troubleshooting, debugging, or repair
Shotgun Software, a project management software for creative studios owned by Autodesk

Slang
Riding shotgun, a passenger sitting beside the driver in a car or other vehicle
Shotgun wedding, a hasty wedding due to unplanned pregnancy
Shotgunning, a method for rapidly drinking beer out of a can by punching a hole in it
to shotgun weed or a joint, when one person forces marijuana smoke into the mouth of another person

Sport
Shotgun (shooting sports), a shooting sports discipline
Shotgun, nickname ("Escopeta" in Spanish) of Sergio Roitman (born 1979), professional tennis player from Argentina
Shotgun formation, an offensive formation in American football
"The Shotgun", a nickname for snooker player Jamie Cope
WWF Shotgun Saturday Night, a television series

Film and television
Shotgun (1955 film), an American Western film
Shotgun, 1989 film with Rif Hutton
Shotgun, retitled After Everything, a 2018 American comedy-drama film
"Shotgun" (Breaking Bad), a season four episode of Breaking Bad

Literature
"Shotgun" (comics), a fictional villain in Marvel Comics works
Shotgun (novel), a novel by Ed McBain
Shotgun News (Firearms News since 2016), an American shooting and firearms interest publication

Music
Shotgun (funk band), American funk band from Detroit, Michigan
Shotgun (rock band), 1970s American rock band from Dallas, Texas
Shotgun (Jamie J. Morgan album), 1990
Shotgun (Tony Lucca album), 2004

Songs
"Shotgun" (Christina Aguilera song), 2015
"Shotgun" (George Ezra song), 2018
"Shotgun" (Junior Walker & the All Stars song), 1965
"Shotgun" (Limp Bizkit song), 2011
"Shotgun" (Sheryl Crow song), 2014
"Shotgun" (Yellow Claw song), 2013
"Shotgun", a song by the Dave Matthews Band
"Shotgun", a song by Soccer Mommy from Sometimes, Forever
"Shotgun", a song by Reks from REBELutionary

See also
Shogun, a Japanese title
Shotgun wedding (disambiguation)